Howard Chumney Fitzgerald [Lefty] (May 16, 1902 – February 27, 1959) was an outfielder in Major League Baseball who played for the Chicago Cubs (1922, 1924) and Boston Red Sox (1926). Fitzgerald batted and threw left-handed. He was born in Eagle Lake, Texas. 
 
In a three-season career, Fitzgerald was a .257 hitter (36-for-140) with 15 runs and 14 RBI in 48 games, including 25 doubles, three triples, and two stolen bases. He did not hit a home run. As a fielder, he appeared in 21 games at left field, 12 at right, and one at center.

Fitzgerald died in an automobile accident in Mathews, Texas at age 56.

Sources

Boston Red Sox players
Chicago Cubs players
Major League Baseball outfielders
Baseball players from Texas
Road incident deaths in Texas
Texas Longhorns baseball players
1902 births
1959 deaths
People from Eagle Lake, Texas